Buoy is a British type of anti-tank obstacle used to block roads intended to impede enemy movement. Buoys were widely deployed during the invasion crisis of 1940–1941. They would be placed in at least five rows across a roadway.

Buoys were intended as an alternative to a simple cylinder of concrete. The advantage of buoy was that it could be used to block or unblock a road quickly. Passing a rod or crossbar through a pair of buoys formed a wheeled axle that could easily be rolled into place; when the axle was removed the buoys could be separated and stood up. Although easily knocked over, the conical shapes could not be rolled very far, they would move unpredictably and out of the field of view of a tank driver, making it difficult to avoid them. They were eventually judged to be ineffective and phased out.

Extant examples are often found by the roadside today.

See also 

British anti-invasion preparations of World War II
British hardened field defences of World War II

References

General references

Anti-tank obstacles